Angus John Brandt (born 26 October 1989) is an Australian professional basketball player for the Kagawa Five Arrows of the Japanese B.League. He played college basketball for Oregon State University before beginning his professional career with the Sydney Kings in 2014. After two seasons with the Kings, he joined the Perth Wildcats, where he won two NBL championships in three years. He has also had stints in Lithuania, New Zealand and Italy.

Early life
Born in Sydney, New South Wales, Brandt grew up in the Blue Mountains region. Living in his hometown of Springwood, he attended Blaxland High School in Blaxland, where he graduated from in 2007.

In 2008, Brandt moved to the United States to attend Lake Forest Academy in Lake Forest, Illinois for a prep season in 2008–09. In his one-season playing for Lake Forest, he averaged 15 points and 10 rebounds per game for coach Matt Vaughn.

College career
As a freshman at Oregon State in 2009–10, Brandt played sparingly for a Beavers team that finished the season with a 14–18 record. In 26 games (two starts), he averaged 1.1 points and 1.1 rebounds in 9.2 minutes per game.

As a sophomore in 2010–11, Brandt earned first-team Pac-12 All-Academic honors, while also earning a bigger role on the team which led to higher production value. In 29 games (21 starts), he averaged 4.8 points and 2.5 rebounds in 16.0 minutes per game.

As a junior in 2011–12, Brandt led the team in three-point field goal percentage with 49.2 percent (29-for-59), finished ninth in the Pac-12 in field goal percentage with 53.5 percent (122-for-228), and earned Pac-12 All-Academic Honorable Mention honors. In 36 games (35 starts), he averaged 9.1 points, 3.4 rebounds and 1.1 assists in 23.2 minutes per game.

On 16 November 2012, Brandt suffered an isolated tear of the ACL in his right knee against Purdue that required surgery and forced him to miss the remainder of the 2012–13 season. He was later granted medical hardship by the Pac-12 Faculty Athletics Representative Committee and deemed eligible to play in 2013–14. In four games (all starts), he averaged 11.3 points, 8.5 rebounds, 1.8 assists, 1.0 steals and 1.3 blocks in 30.5 minutes per game. He was again named to the Pac-12 All-Academic Honorable Mention team.

As a redshirted senior in 2013–14, Brandt finished 11th in the Pac-12 in field goal percentage with 51.1 percent (138-for-265), and earned second-team Pac-12 All-Academic honors. On 18 December 2013, he recorded a career-high 27 points against Towson. In 30 games (all starts), he averaged 12.6 points, 3.9 rebounds and 1.5 assists in 25.4 minutes per game.

Professional career

Sydney Kings (2014–2016)
On 16 June 2014, Brandt signed a three-year deal with the Sydney Kings of the National Basketball League. The following month, he joined the Penrith Panthers of the Waratah League in preparation for the 2014–15 NBL season. With the Panthers, he played alongside his brother, Louis. In six games for the Panthers, he averaged 25.3 points and 10.2 rebounds per game.

A knee injury suffered on New Year's Eve saw Brandt miss seven matches during his rookie season with the Kings. Despite this, he was named NBL Rookie of the Year for the 2014–15 season, averaging 7.4 points and four rebounds per game while shooting at nearly 50 per cent from the field over 21 games. He went on to play all 28 games for the Kings in 2015–16, averaging 8.1 points, 5.3 rebounds and 1.2 blocks per game.

Lithuania (2016)
On 23 February 2016, Brandt signed with Neptūnas Klaipėda of Lithuania for the rest of the 2015–16 LKL season. He helped Neptūnas reach the LKL Finals, where they were defeated 4–1 in the best-of-seven series by Žalgiris. In 21 games, Brandt averaged 4.6 points and 3.8 rebounds per game.

Perth Wildcats and Hawke's Bay Hawks (2016–2019)

On 12 May 2016, Brandt signed a two-year deal with the Perth Wildcats. His first season with the Wildcats saw him improve as the year went on, as he had a number of memorable performances as the Wildcats faced clutch games towards the end of the season. On 20 January 2017, Brandt played a season-high 30 minutes off the bench and had season-best figures of 17 points and 11 rebounds in an 84–78 overtime win over the Cairns Taipans. The Wildcats finished the regular season in third place with a 15–13 record, and went on to sweep the second-seeded Taipans in the semi-finals to make it through to the best-of-five NBL Grand Final series against the Illawarra Hawks. In game two of the series, Brandt stepped up to cover the loss of Matthew Knight, who suffered a head injury. Brandt recorded 15 points and 11 rebounds to help the Wildcats take a 2–0 lead in the series. The Wildcats took out the championship in game three with a 95–86 win, thus sweeping the series. Brandt had six points, seven rebounds and four assists in 20 minutes off the bench in game three. He appeared in all 33 games for the Wildcats in 2016–17, averaging 6.0 points, 2.9 rebounds and 1.1 assists per game. His development as the season went on saw him earn the Perth Wildcats Most Improved Player Award.

On 17 July 2017, Brandt signed a two-year contract extension with the Wildcats. Brandt turned the hook shot into his trademark during the 2017–18 season. On 16 February 2018, in the Wildcats' second last game of the season, Brandt scored 24 points in a 97–85 loss to Melbourne United. The Wildcats finished the regular season in third place with a 16–12 record before going on to lose 2–0 to the Adelaide 36ers in the semi-finals. Brandt appeared in all 30 games for the Wildcats in 2017–18, averaging 9.8 points, 4.7 rebounds and 1.4 assists per game.

Following the conclusion of the Wildcats' season, Brandt joined the Hawke's Bay Hawks for the 2018 New Zealand NBL season. On 4 May, in just his third game of the season, Brandt scored a season-high 23 points to go with 14 rebounds in a 90–87 win over the Taranaki Mountainairs. On 16 June, he recorded 22 points and a season-high 17 rebounds in a 93–84 win over the Super City Rangers. On 27 July, he had a second 17-rebound effort to go with 14 points against the Canterbury Rams. He helped the Hawks finish the regular season in fourth place with a 12–6 record. In their semi-final against the Wellington Saints, Brandt scored 16 points in a 99–73 loss. In 17 games, he averaged 15.2 points, 8.4 rebounds and 1.6 assists per game. He was subsequently named to the NZNBL All-Star Five.

On 19 September 2018, Brandt was ruled out for three to six weeks with an ankle injury he suffered while playing for the Australian Boomers. He subsequently missed the NBL Blitz and NBA pre-season games. On 27 October 2018, Brandt recorded 14 points and 20 rebounds (12 of them offensive) in a 101–96 double-overtime win over Melbourne United, becoming the first Wildcat with 20+ rebounds in 12 years. On 10 February 2019, he recorded 19 points and nine rebounds in a 95–86 overtime win over the Sydney Kings. He helped the Wildcats win the minor premiership with a first-place finish and an 18–10 record, before going on to advance through to the NBL Grand Final series, where they defeated Melbourne 3–1, with Brandt becoming a two-time champion. In 31 games, he averaged 8.0 points, 5.5 rebounds and 1.3 assists per game.

On 29 March 2019, Brandt parted ways with the Wildcats after opting to exercise the European out-clause in his contract.

On 26 April 2019, Brandt returned to the Hawke's Bay Hawks, signing as a short-term injury replacement for Daniel Kickert. He appeared in two games for the Hawks.

China (2019)
In June 2019, Brandt joined Wuhan Dangdai of the Chinese NBL. In 13 games, he averaged 20.3 points, 15.2 rebounds and 1.8 assists per game.

Italy (2019–2020)
On 20 July 2019, Brandt signed with Italian team Pistoia Basket 2000. The 2019–20 LBA season was cancelled in February 2020 due to the coronavirus pandemic. In 19 games, he averaged 11.0 points, 7.9 rebounds and 1.5 assists per game.

Japan (2020–present)
On 17 August 2020, Brandt signed with the Shiga Lakestars of the Japanese B.League. In 56 games, he averaged 11.9 points, 8.6 rebounds and 3.3 assists per game.

On 25 June 2021, Brandt signed with the Kagawa Five Arrows, returning to the B.League for a second stint.

On 8 June 2022, Brandt re-signed with the Five Arrows for the 2022–23 season.

National team career
In 2011, Brandt was part of the Australian University national team that played at the 26th World University Games in Shenzhen, China. In 2014, he was part of the Boomers team that played in the four-game Sino-Australia Challenge series.

In June 2017, Brandt was named in a 20-man Boomers squad ahead of the 2017 FIBA Asia Cup. A month later, he was named in the final 12-man squad. On 24 October 2017, he was named in the 12-man Boomers squad to compete in the first two games of the FIBA World Cup Qualifiers in November.

In February 2022, Brandt was named in a 17-man Australian Boomers squad ahead of the FIBA World Cup Qualifiers in Japan. He re-joined the team later that year for the next qualifying window.

Personal life
Brandt is the son of John and Lorraine Brandt, and has two brothers, Seamus and Louis.

Notes

References

External links

Kagawa Five Arrows player profile
Pistoia Basket 2000 player profile
Perth Wildcats player profile
Sydney Kings player profile
OSU Beavers player bio
"Building a Champion Brandt" at nbl.com.au
"Brandt Recognition" at nbl.com.au

1989 births
Living people
Australian expatriate basketball people in Italy
Australian expatriate basketball people in Japan
Australian expatriate basketball people in Lithuania
Australian expatriate basketball people in the United States
Australian men's basketball players
Basketball players at the 2018 Commonwealth Games
Basketball players from Sydney
BC Neptūnas players
Centers (basketball)
Commonwealth Games gold medallists for Australia
Commonwealth Games medallists in basketball
Hawke's Bay Hawks players
Kagawa Five Arrows players
Lake Forest Academy alumni
Lega Basket Serie A players
Oregon State Beavers men's basketball players
Perth Wildcats players
Pistoia Basket 2000 players
Shiga Lakes players
Sydney Kings players
Medallists at the 2018 Commonwealth Games